Anjineh-ye Ebrahim may refer to:
 Anjineh-ye Ebrahim-e Jonubi
 Anjineh-ye Ebrahim-e Shomali